Lucas Severino (born 3 January 1979), commonly known as Lucas, is a Brazilian former professional footballer who played as a forward. He played for the Brazil national team at the 2000 Summer Olympics in Australia.

Career

Rennes
Lucas Severino was born in Ribeirão Preto. He began his career in Brazil with Botafogo (SP) and then Atlético Paranaense. He moved to Ligue 1 side Rennes for €21 million. He made 72 league appearances with the side over three seasons, scoring six goals.

FC Tokyo
On 1 January 2004, Lucas Severino signed for J1 League FC Tokyo on a free transfer. He played four seasons for the club, winning the J.League Cup in 2004.

Gamba Osaka
On 1 January 2008, after four years at FC Tokyo, Lucas Severino moved to J1 League club Gamba Osaka on a free transfer.

Return to FC Tokyo
After three years with Gamba Osaka and a short spell in Brazil for Atlético Paranaense in 2011 Lucas retired from the game. However, in July 2011, he returned to sign for his former club FC Tokyo in the J2 League. His return helped FC Tokyo to promotion from J2 League back to the J1 League.

International career
Lucas Severino made fourteen appearances for Brazil U23, appearing in the 2000 Summer Olympics, where he played three matches.

Career statistics

Honours
Club
AFC Champions League – 2008
Pan-Pacific Championship – 2008
Emperor's Cup – 2008, 2009, 2011
J.League Cup – 2004

References

External links

1979 births
Living people
Brazilian footballers
Brazilian expatriate footballers
Expatriate footballers in Japan
Campeonato Brasileiro Série A players
J1 League players
J2 League players
Botafogo Futebol Clube (SP) players
Club Athletico Paranaense players
Cruzeiro Esporte Clube players
Sport Club Corinthians Paulista players
FC Tokyo players
Gamba Osaka players
Olympic footballers of Brazil
Footballers at the 2000 Summer Olympics
Association football forwards
Stade Rennais F.C. players
Ligue 1 players
Expatriate footballers in France
People from Ribeirão Preto
Footballers from São Paulo (state)